Bone morphogenetic protein 8A (BMP8A) is a protein that in humans is encoded by the BMP8A gene.

BMP8A is a polypeptide member of the TGFβ superfamily of proteins. It, like other bone morphogenetic proteins (BMPs), is involved in the development of bone and cartilage. BMP8A may be involved in epithelial osteogenesis. It also plays a role in bone homeostasis. It is a disulfide-linked homodimer.

References

External links

Further reading

Bone morphogenetic protein
Developmental genes and proteins
TGFβ domain